The Norwegian Institute of Public Health is responsible for maintaining and revising the list of notifiable diseases in Norway and participates in the European Centre for Disease Prevention and Control (ECDC) and the World Health Organization's surveillance of infectious diseases. The notifiable diseases are classified into Group A, Group B and Group C diseases, depending on the procedure for reporting the disease.

Group A diseases
Group A diseases are reported with full patient identification by clinicians and laboratories. The copies of notifications are sent also to Municipal Medical Officer of the patient's municipality. As of 2018, 60 diseases have been classified as Group A diseases.

AIDS
Anthrax
Botulism
Brucellosis
Campylobacteriosis
Cholera
Co-infection HIV and tuberculosis
Cryptosporidiosis
Dengue fever
Diphtheria
Echinococcus
Enteropathogen E. coli enteritis
Giardiasis
Haemophilus influenzae, systemic disease
Hemorrhagic fever
Hemolytic uremic syndrome, diarrhoea associated
Hepatitis A
Hepatitis B
Hepatitis C
HPV-infection causing cancer or pre-cancerous lesions
Infection or carrier state of microbes with  special resistance patterns
Infection or carrier state of methicillin-resistant Staphylococcus aureus (MRSA)
Infection or carrier state of Streptococcus pneumoniae with reduced susceptibility to penicillin
Infection or carrier state of vancomycin resistant Enterococcus
Influenza caused by virus with pandemic potential
Legionellosis
Leprosy
Listeriosis
Lyme borreliosis
Malaria
Measles
Meningococcal systemic disease
Mumps
Hemorrhagic fever with renal syndrome  (Nephropathia epidemica)
Paratyphoid fever
Pertussis
Plague
Pneumococcal systemic disease
Poliomyelitis
Q-fever
Prion diseases
Rabies
Relapsing fever
Rubella
Salmonellosis
Severe acute respiratory syndrome (SARS)
Shigellosis
Smallpox
Streptococcus Group A systemic disease
Streptococcus Group B systemic disease
Tetanus
Trichinosis
Tuberculosis
Tularaemia
Typhoid fever
Typhus (epidemic)
Viral infections in central nervous system
West Nile fever
Yellow fever
Yersiniosis

Group B diseases
Group B diseases are reported to the Norwegian Institute of Public Health after de-identifying the patient. The month and year of birth, gender and municipality are reported. Copies of the notifications from clinicians are sent to the Municipal Medical Officer in the patient's municipality. This group of diseases includes gonorrhoea, HIV infection and syphilis.

Group C diseases
Group C diseases are de-identified and the number of patients is reported from medical microbiological laboratories. This group includes genital chlamydia, Clostridium difficile infection and influenza-like disease (ILI). The number of Clostridium difficile cases are reported monthly, genital chlamydia numbers are reported annually and influenza-like disease is reported weekly.

References

Health law in Norway
Norway